Fortel-en-Artois (literally "Fortel in Artois") is a commune in the Pas-de-Calais department in the Hauts-de-France region of France.

Geography

Population

Places of interest
 The church of St.Pierre, dating from the eighteenth century.
 A big sandstone crucifix at the road junction.

See also
Communes of the Pas-de-Calais department

References

Fortelenartois